The President of the National Assembly of Armenia is the speaker of the house in the Parliament of Armenia. The incumbent speaker is Alen Simonyan, since 2 August 2021.

Predecessors of the National Assembly of Armenia were the Parliament (August 1918 – December 1920), the Supreme Soviet of the Armenian Soviet Socialist Republic (1920–1990) and the Supreme Council of Armenia (1990–1995).

List of speakers 
 Political party

First Republic of Armenia (1918–1920) 
Speakers of the Parliament of the First Republic of Armenia

Armenia (1991–present) 
Chairmen of the Supreme Council

President of the National Assembly of Armenia

See also 

 National Assembly of Armenia
 Politics of Armenia
 President of Armenia
 Prime Minister of Armenia
 Supreme Council of Armenia

References 

Armenia
Politics of Armenia